Xeniya Volnukhina (born 1982) is a handball player from Kazakhstan. She has played on the Kazakhstan women's national handball team, and participated at the 2011 World Women's Handball Championship in Brazil.

References

1982 births
Living people
Kazakhstani female handball players
Asian Games medalists in handball
Handball players at the 2014 Asian Games
Asian Games bronze medalists for Kazakhstan
Medalists at the 2014 Asian Games
21st-century Kazakhstani women